Stilbosis amphibola is a moth in the family Cosmopterigidae. It was described by Walsingham in 1909. It is found in Mexico.

References

Natural History Museum Lepidoptera generic names catalog

Moths described in 1909
Chrysopeleiinae
Moths of Central America